Klute is a 1971 American neo-noir crime thriller film directed and produced by Alan J. Pakula, written by Andy and Dave Lewis, and starring Jane Fonda, Donald Sutherland, Charles Cioffi and Roy Scheider. The film follows a high-priced call girl who assists a detective in solving a missing-persons case. It is the first installment of what has informally come to be known as Pakula's "paranoia trilogy". The other two films are The Parallax View (1974) and All the President's Men (1976).

Klute was theatrically released in the United States on June 25, 1971 by Warner Bros. to critical and commercial success. Reviewers praised the film's direction, screenplay and most notably Fonda's performance, while the film grossed over $12 million against a $2.5 million budget. It received two nominations at the 44th Academy Awards: Best Original Screenplay and Best Actress, which Fonda won.

Plot
After Pennsylvania chemical company executive Tom Gruneman disappears, the police find an obscene letter in Gruneman's office addressed to a New York City call girl named Bree Daniels, who had received several such letters. After six months of fruitless police work, Peter Cable, a fellow executive at Gruneman's company, hires family friend and detective John Klute to investigate Gruneman's disappearance.

Klute rents an apartment in the basement of Bree's building, taps her phone and follows her as she turns tricks. Bree appears to enjoy the freedom of freelancing as a call girl while auditioning for acting and modeling jobs, but she reveals the emptiness of her life to her psychiatrist. Bree refuses to answer Klute's questions at first. After learning that he has been watching her, Bree says that she does not recognize Gruneman. She acknowledges having been beaten by a john two years earlier, but cannot identify Gruneman from a photo. Bree takes Klute to meet her former pimp Frank Ligourin, who managed Jane McKenna, a prostitute who had referred the abusive client to Bree. McKenna has apparently committed suicide, and their other colleague Arlyn Page has since become a drug addict and disappeared.

Klute and Bree develop a romance, although she tells her psychiatrist that she wishes that she could return to "just feeling numb" turning tricks. She tells Klute that she is paranoid that she is being watched. They find Page, who tells them that the photo of Gruneman is not that of the client, who was an older man. Page's body is later found in the river. Klute connects the apparent suicides of the two prostitutes, surmising that the client was using Gruneman's name. He also thinks the client killed Gruneman and might kill Bree next. Klute revisits Gruneman's acquaintances. By typographic comparison, the obscene letters are traced to Cable, to whom Klute has been reporting during his investigation. Klute asks Cable for money to buy the "black book" of McKenna's clients to learn the identity of the abusive client. He leaves enough bread crumbs to see whether Cable reveals his own complicity in the murders.

Cable follows Bree to a client's office and reveals that he sent her the letters. Cable tells her that after Gruneman accidentally found him physically abusing McKenna, Cable was worried that Gruneman would use the incident to sabotage Cable's career, and Cable tried to frame Gruneman by planting the letter in his office. After playing an audiotape that he recorded as he murdered Page, he attacks Bree. When he sees Klute rush in, Cable abruptly lurches backward, crashing through a window to his death.

Bree vacates her apartment with Klute's help. A voiceover conversation with her psychiatrist reveals her hesitancy to surrender her life of autonomy to enter into a traditional relationship with Klute, saying that she would lose her mind if she turned to a domestic lifestyle. She admits that although she will miss Klute, she is unable to tell him, and jokes that the doctor will likely see her again the next week. As they leave the apartment, Bree receives a telephone call from a client, and she informs him she is leaving New York and does not expect to return. She and Klute leave the apartment together.

Cast

In addition: Robert Milli appears briefly as Tom Grunerman, Trina's murdered husband; Jean Stapleton appears as a secretary; and Sylvester Stallone appears as an uncredited extra in a club scene.

Production

Development
To prepare for her role as Bree, Jane Fonda spent a week in New York City observing high-class call girls and madams. She also accompanied them on their outings to after-hours clubs to solicit men. Fonda was disturbed that none of the men showed interest in her, which she believed was because they could see that she was really just an "upper-class, privileged pretender."

Fonda had doubts about whether she could portray the role and asked Alan Pakula to release her from her contract and hire Faye Dunaway instead, but Pakula refused. One of Fonda's primary concerns was that she, as a nascent feminist, should not play a prostitute, but when Fonda admitted this concern to a more longstanding feminist, she was disabused of the notion. To overcome her doubts that she could not play such a role, Fonda turned to her memories of several call girls whom she had known while living in France, all of whom worked for the famed Madame Claude. She remembered that all of them had been sexually abused as children, and Fonda used this as an "entry" to her own character and as a way to understand Bree's motivations in becoming a prostitute.

Release

Home media
Klute was released on DVD in 2005, and on Blu-ray by The Criterion Collection in July 2019.

Box office
The film earned US$8 million in theatrical rentals at the North American box office.

Critical response

Klute was praised for its screenplay and Fonda's performance. On Rotten Tomatoes, Klute holds an approval rating of 93% based on 40 reviews, with an average rating of 8.19/10. The website's critical consensus reads: "Donald Sutherland is coolly commanding and Jane Fonda a force of nature in Klute, a cuttingly intelligent thriller that generates its most agonizing tension from its stars' repartee." On Metacritic, which assigns a rating to reviews, the film has a weighted average score of 81 out of 100, based on 47 critics, indicating "universal acclaim."

The New York Times wrote, “Pakula, when he is not indulging in subjective camera, strives to give his film the look of structural geometry, but despite the sharp edges and dramatic spaces and cinema presence out of ‘Citizen Kane’ it all suggests a tepid, rather tasteless mush. The acting in ‘Klute’ seems semi-improvisatory, and in this Jane Fonda, who is good at confessing, is generally successful. Everybody else merely talks a lot, except for Sutherland, who scarcely talks at all. A normally inventive actor, he is here given precisely the latitude to evoke a romantic figure with all the mysterious intensity of a youthful Calvin Coolidge.”

Roger Ebert of the Chicago Sun-Times awarded Klute 3.5 stars out of a possible 4, writing that while the thriller elements were poorly executed, the performances of Sutherland and especially Fonda carried the film. He suggested that the film should have been titled Bree after her character, who is the soul of the movie and avoids the hooker with a heart of gold stereotype: "What is it about Jane Fonda that makes her such a fascinating actress to watch? She has a sort of nervous intensity that keeps her so firmly locked into a film character that the character actually seems distracted by things that come up in the movie."

Gene Siskel of the Chicago Tribune was appreciative: “More interesting than the mystery is the character of Bree….the nicest part of her character (due to the script and Miss Fonda’s fine performance) is that this prostitute doesn’t have a heart of gold. She’s a hungup little broad who, when cornered by violence or tenderness, will scratch and bite. Director Alan Pakula’s…crisply edited movie runs too long only in drawing out its conclusion….Sharp eyes will solve the mystery midway thru the film. Miss Fonda’s performance is superior to her most recent work in ‘They Shoot Horses, Don’t They?’….Sutherland…presents a controlled posture as the industrious detective. His low profile nicely balances Miss Fonda’s incendiary role.”

Fonda's performance received widespread praise. The Rotten Tomatoes consensus declares: "Fonda makes all the right choices, from the mechanics of her walk and her voice inflection to the penetration of the girl's raging psyche. It is a rare performance."

Accolades

References

External links

 
 
 
 
 Klute: Trying to See Her, an essay by Mark Harris at the Criterion Collection
 

1970s crime thriller films
1971 crime films
American crime thriller films
American detective films
American neo-noir films
1970s English-language films
Films about prostitution in the United States
Films directed by Alan J. Pakula
Films featuring a Best Actress Academy Award-winning performance
Films featuring a Best Drama Actress Golden Globe-winning performance
Films scored by Michael Small
Films set in apartment buildings
Films set in New York City
1970s American films